The 1972 Pacific-8 Conference football season took place during the 1972 NCAA University Division football season. The conference featured the eventual national champions in USC.

Games

Week 1

Week 2

Week 3

Week 4

Week 5

Week 6

Week 7

Week 8

Week 9

Week 10

Week 11

Bowl games

See also
1972 All-Pacific-8 Conference football team

References